Madame Doubtfire, known as Alias Madame Doubtfire in the United States, is a 1987 novel written by English author Anne Fine for teenage and young adult audiences. The novel is based on a family with divorced parents. Well received upon its publication in the UK, it was shortlisted for awards, including the Guardian Children's Fiction Prize and Whitbread Children's Book Award.

In November 1993, six years after its publication, the novel was adapted into Mrs. Doubtfire, a film starring Robin Williams and Sally Field.

Synopsis
Daniel and Miranda Hilliard are separated and Miranda, a successful businesswoman, severely limits the amount of time Daniel, an impractical, out-of-work actor moonlighting as a nude model for an amateur art class, is allowed to spend with their three children Lydia, Christopher and Natalie.

When Miranda decides to hire a nanny, however, Daniel disguises himself as a woman and gets the job. Lydia and Natalie immediately know who "Madame Doubtfire" is, with Lydia explaining the situation to Christopher, but Miranda is fooled. Daniel uses his disguise to spend time with his children. He is a mediocre housekeeper, but an excellent gardener. 

Daniel's art class needs to find a place to convene, and Miranda grudgingly offers the use of her home. After Miranda discovers Daniel's secret, they have a terrible fight in front of the children, culminating in the children announcing that they hate both of their parents. Finally the situation is resolved, with Miranda offering Daniel a position as gardener, enabling him to spend more time with his children.

Awards and nominations
 1987: Guardian Children's Fiction Prize (shortlist)
 1987: Observer Teenage Fiction Prize (shortlist)
 1987: Whitbread Children's Book Award (shortlist)

Film adaptation

The feature film adaptation was produced by 20th Century Fox (with a budget of $25 million) and was released on 24 November 1993. The adaptation was directed by Chris Columbus, and written by Randi Mayem Singer and Leslie Dixon. Robin Williams played the eponymous character, and Sally Field played his wife Miranda.

In the film, his disguise includes a prosthetic mask, which is so convincing that no one in his family recognizes him at first. Greg Cannom, Ve Neill, and Yolanda Toussieng received the Academy Award for Best Makeup for creating Mrs. Doubtfire. Grossing $441.3 million worldwide, it became the second-highest-grossing film of 1993, behind only Jurassic Park.

See also
 Avvai Shanmughi
 Chachi 420

References

1987 British novels
British comedy novels
British novels adapted into films
British young adult novels
Comedy literature characters
Costa Book Award-winning works
Cross-dressing in literature
Hamish Hamilton books
Literary characters introduced in 1987
Novels about actors
Novels by Anne Fine